The Man from Brodney's is a 1923 American silent drama film directed by David Smith and starring J. Warren Kerrigan, Alice Calhoun, and Wanda Hawley. It was produced and released by the Vitagraph Company of America.

Plot
As described in a film magazine, the law firm of Brodney and Company sends Hollingsworth Chase, an American, to the Island of Japat in the South Seas to represent the natives in a strange lawsuit. The Island of Japat, which has jewel mines of great value, is to go the grandchildren of its owners, provided that they marry within six months of the filing of the will. If the grandchildren fail to comply with the terms of the will, the Island will revert to the natives that live there. The natives, under the leadership of Rasula, make desperate attempts to bring about the deaths of the heirs. Chase joins forces against them. The infuriated natives make a mass attack on the mine operators and heirs, resulting in a terrific struggle. Just when it becomes impossible for the small group of men to hold out any longer, a United States destroyer comes to their aid. Rasula is killed, and the natives agree to a compromise under which the heirs agree to pay the government a fair royalty for the output of the mines. Princess Genevra, a European princess who had been visiting the Island of Japat for a rest, confesses to Chase that her love for him is greater than her love for any power, and that she intends to sacrifice her throne for him.

Cast

Preservation
The film survives incomplete or abridged by a collector.

References

External links

American silent feature films
Films directed by David Smith (director)
Vitagraph Studios films
American black-and-white films
Silent American drama films
1923 drama films
1920s American films
1920s English-language films
English-language drama films